Feel Good is a studio album by Ike & Tina Turner. It was released on United Artists Records in 1972.

Recording and release 
Feel Good showcases Ike & Tina Turner's signature style of rock infused soul with a mix of early funk. The album contains one cover song, "She Came In Through The Bathroom Window" by the Beatles, the rest of the tracks are written by Tina Turner. The album was recorded at the Turners' Bolic Sound studio. It was produced by Ike Turner and Gerhard Augustin. The album peaked at No. 160 on Billboard's Top LP's chart. It reached No. 27 on the Soul LP's chart before the chart was absorbed into the Top LP's chart.

The title track, "Feel Good," was released as the lead single in April 1972. The Turners promoted the single on Soul Train that month. It reach No. 48 on the Cash Box R&B chart and No. 95 on [[Record World|Record World'''s]] Singles chart. The second single "She Came In Through The Bathroom Window," was released in the Netherlands while Ike & Tina Turner were on tour in Europe. They performed the song on Rollin' on the River.

 Critical reception Record World (July 8, 1972): "With the release of this album, Tina Turner is now fully confirmed as a first class writer. Ms. Dynamite has penned all tunes save for the Lennon-McCartney 'She Came In Through the Bathroom Window.' Title track should have done better as a single."

Billboard (July 15, 1972):The Turners have another top flight album here especially in the driving numbers, such as "If You Can Hully Gully (l Can Hully Gully Too)" and Lennon-McCartney's "She Came in Through the Bathroom Window." Nine of 10 tunes are Tina's own compositions. Other cuts by this always exciting act include "Bolic," "You Better Think of Something," "Black Coffee" and the title single.

 Reissues Feel Good was reissued by Raven Records on the compilation CD Nutbush City Limits/Feel Good'' in 2006.

Track listing

Chart performance

Notes

References 

1972 albums
Ike & Tina Turner albums
Albums produced by Ike Turner
United Artists Records albums
Funk albums by American artists
Soul albums by American artists
Albums produced by Gerhard Augustin
Albums recorded at Bolic Sound